Say You Do may refer to:
 "Say You Do" (Dierks Bentley song)
 "Say You Do" (Janet Jackson song)
 "Say You Do" (Sigala song)
 "Say You Do" (Ultra song)